Norbert Steger (born 6 March 1944) is an Austrian lawyer and former politician for the Freedom Party of Austria (FPÖ). He was the FPÖ party leader from 1980 to 1986, and Vice Chancellor and Minister of Commerce of Austria from 1983 to 1987.

Under his leadership of the FPÖ, the party adopted a more liberal program and a less confrontational discourse. He sought to turn the party to become something of an Austrian version of the German Free Democratic Party, focusing on free market and anti-statist policies. His daughter is the National Council member Petra Steger.

References 

|-

1944 births
Living people
Vice-Chancellors of Austria
Freedom Party of Austria politicians
Politicians from Vienna